Warren Dobson (born 7 March 1980 in Ranfurly, New Zealand) is a curler who was on the team for New Zealand at the 2006 Winter Olympics. He was on the teams that won the 2003 and 2004 Pacific Curling Championships.

References

External links

Olympic curlers of New Zealand
Curlers at the 2006 Winter Olympics
New Zealand male curlers
New Zealand curling champions
1980 births
Living people
People from Ranfurly, New Zealand
Pacific-Asian curling champions
21st-century New Zealand people